Balaustium vignae is a species of mite belonging to the family Erythraeidae. This moderately hairy orange mite is around 1 mm in length with one pair of eyes set well back on the body. It can be distinguished from similar species by the first pair of legs being longer than the body and the lack of a suture dividing the abdomen.

The adult is associated with Vicia faba whereas the nymphs are found on various grasses. It is found in the vicinity of Potchefstroom, South Africa.

References
Nine new species of the superfamily Erythraeoidea (Acarina: Trombidiformes) associated with plants in South Africa, Magdalena K.P. Meyer & P.A.J. Ryke, Acarologia I

Trombidiformes
Animals described in 1959
Endemic fauna of South Africa